Andrew G. White FAA is an Australian scientist and is currently Professor of Physics and a Vice-Chancellor's Senior Research Fellow at the University of Queensland. He is also Director of the University of Queensland Quantum technology Laboratory; Deputy-Director of the ARC Centre for Engineered Quantum systems, and a Program Manager in the ARC Centre for Quantum Computer and Communication Technology. (He has been a founding member of three Australian Research Council Centres of Excellence,).

He researches in quantum optics, quantum information science and fundamental quantum science. His highly cited publications include work on how to create and detect an optical vortex, sources of quantum entanglement, quantum tomography, and demonstration of the first entangling version of a quantum logic gates.

Honours and awards
2021 Australian Laureate Fellowship
2010 Fellow of the American Physical Society
2010 Pawsey Medal of the Australian Academy of Science
2009 Fellow of the Optical Society of America
2006 Australian Research Council Federation Fellowship

Selected publications

References

External links
 Andrew G. White: Home page. Physics, University of Queensland.
   Quantum Technology Lab. University of Queensland

Living people
Australian physicists
Fellows of the American Physical Society
Quantum information scientists
Year of birth missing (living people)